Ahmed Baba Zuruq (October 20, 1951), Danmasanin Patigi, is a Nigeria senator from the Kwara North delegation elected in 1999 to 2003. He is a member of the Revenue Mobilization, Allocation and Fiscal Commission nominated by the Senate.

Education 
He holds a post graduate diploma in Business administrative management from the British Institute of Administrative Management.

2002 parties 
Zuruq led five lawmakers in the House of Representatives delegation from Kwara State, the members includes, Hon. Isa Bio, Rauf Shittu, Ruqayyah Gbemisola Saraki, Bashir Oni and Farouk Sarouk to decamp from the All Nigeria Peoples Party to the ruling party PDP in an compliance with the directive of Dr. Olusola Saraki, the father of Gbemisola Saraki and Bukola Saraki.

References

External links 

 
 
 
 

Living people
1951 births
Peoples Democratic Party members of the Senate (Nigeria)
20th-century Nigerian politicians
21st-century Nigerian politicians